Theocracy is a form of government in which God or a deity is recognized as the supreme civil ruler.

Theocracy may also refer to:
 Theocracy (band), a metal band
 Theocracy (album), an album by the same band
 Theocracy (computer game), a computer strategy game